Carol Christ may refer to:

Carol T. Christ, scholar of Victorian literature and Chancellor of the University of California, Berkeley
Carol P. Christ, scholar of feminism and theology